Anthony Alfred Harmsworth Marlowe,  (25 October 1904 – 8 September 1965) was a British barrister and politician, who served as a member of parliament (MP) for 24 years.

Family
Marlowe was the son of Thomas Marlowe, who was editor of the Daily Mail from 1899 to 1926 and also Chairman of Associated Newspapers. Thomas Marlowe gave his son the middle names 'Alfred Harmsworth' from the company's founder Alfred Harmsworth. He was sent to Marlborough College, from where he went on to Trinity College, Cambridge.

Legal career
Anthony Marlowe was interested in the practice of law from an early age and was called to the Bar (Inner Temple) in 1928. The next year, he married the daughter of well-known Barrister Sir Patrick Hastings. He practised in London on the South-Eastern Circuit. At the time of the Munich crisis, Marlowe enlisted in the Army Officers' Reserve, and he joined up full-time during the Second World War; he served as a Lieutenant-Colonel on the staff of the Judge Advocate-General. At the end of the war, Marlowe was appointed as a King's Counsel and presided at several war crimes trials in Germany covering Nazi atrocities.

Entry into politics
In November 1941, Marlowe had been elected unopposed as a Conservative Member of Parliament for Brighton, and kept the seat at the 1945 general election.

Boundary changes
The two-member Brighton constituency was very large, and was divided in three at the 1950 general election, producing a safe Conservative seat in Brighton Pavilion, a potentially marginal seat in Brighton Kemptown, and an even safer Conservative seat in Hove. Marlowe was chosen for this seat, with the other sitting member William Teeling standing in Pavilion. Marlowe found that Hove remained safely Conservative for the rest of his career.

Parliamentary career
Marlowe, who continued his legal career in parallel with his Parliamentary one, was a backbencher in the House of Commons. He enjoyed the freedom to criticise proposals by the Conservative government of Winston Churchill, and in 1953 led a rebellion against the government's refusal to restore a 20-year-old cut in service officers' pensions. The rebels eventually won. Later in the 1950s Marlowe joined a group who protested about the effects of decontrolling private housing rents.

From 1960, Marlowe pressed for private healthcare patients to be given the right to buy prescription drugs at the same prices as those charged to NHS patients. In general Marlowe was a right-winger, and he abstained on a vote to endorse the Macmillan government's bid to join the European Economic Community.

Health concerns
Safely re-elected at the 1964 general election, Marlowe suffered a mild heart attack at the end of March 1965. He took some time to recover and had to be taken in an ambulance to vote in a crunch debate on steel nationalisation that May. He then announced that, on medical advice, he would not fight the next election. In fact, Marlowe's health took a turn for the worse, and he resigned his seat in June, dying in September, aged 60.

References
M. Stenton and S. Lees, "Who's Who of British MPs" Vol. IV (Harvester Press, 1981)
Obituary, The Times, 10 September 1965.

External links 
 

1904 births
1965 deaths
Alumni of Trinity College, Cambridge
British Army General List officers
Conservative Party (UK) MPs for English constituencies
UK MPs 1935–1945
UK MPs 1945–1950
UK MPs 1950–1951
UK MPs 1951–1955
UK MPs 1955–1959
UK MPs 1959–1964
UK MPs 1964–1966